Charles Albert Comiskey (August 15, 1859 – October 26, 1931), nicknamed "Commy" or "The Old Roman", was an American Major League Baseball player, manager and team owner. He was a key person in the formation of the American League, and was also founding owner of the Chicago White Sox. Comiskey Park, the White Sox's storied baseball stadium, was built under his guidance and named for him.

Comiskey's reputation was permanently tarnished by his team's involvement in the Black Sox Scandal, although he was inducted as an executive into the Baseball Hall of Fame in 1939.

Early life
Comiskey was born on August 15, 1859, in Chicago, the son of Illinois politician John Comiskey. He attended public and parochial schools in Chicago, including St. Ignatius Preparatory School, and, later, St. Mary's College (in St. Mary's, Kansas). He played baseball at St. Mary's, and played for several professional teams in Chicago while apprenticed to a plumber and working at construction jobs including driving a brick delivery wagon for the construction crews building the fifth Chicago City Hall, which stood from 1873 to 1885.

Baseball career

Playing and managing career

Comiskey started his playing career as a pitcher, and moved to first base after developing arm trouble. He is credited with being the first to play hitters off of first base, allowing him to cover balls hit to more of the infield. He entered the American Association in 1882 with the St. Louis Brown Stockings. He managed the team during parts of its first seasons and took over full-time in 1885, leading the Browns to four consecutive American Association championships and a close second in 1889. He also played and managed for the Chicago Pirates in the Players' League (1890), the Browns again (1891), and the Cincinnati Reds in the National League (1892–1894).

As an owner

Comiskey left Cincinnati and the majors in fall 1894 to purchase the Western League Sioux City Cornhuskers in Sioux City, Iowa and move it to Saint Paul, Minnesota, renaming the team the St. Paul Saints. He had compiled a .264 batting average with 29 home runs, 883 RBI and 419 stolen bases. As a manager, he posted an 839-542 record.
After five seasons of sharing the Twin Cities with another Western League club in Minneapolis, Comiskey and his colleagues arranged to share Chicago with the National League, whose club (the Chicago Cubs today) played on the West Side. The St. Paul Saints moved to the South Side as the White Stockings of the renamed American League for the 1900 season (which was also the original name of the Cubs; it was eventually shortened to White Sox). The American League then declared itself a major league starting in 1901.

As owner of the White Sox from 1900 until his death in 1931, Comiskey oversaw building Comiskey Park in 1910 and winning five American League pennants (1900, 1901, 1906, 1917, 1919) and two World Series (1906, 1917). He lost popularity with his players, whose views of him became hateful, seen as a factor in the Black Sox scandal, when eight players on the AL champions conspired to "throw" the 1919 World Series to the NL champion Cincinnati Reds. Comiskey was notoriously stingy (his defenders called him "frugal"), even forcing his players to pay to launder their own uniforms.  Traci Peterson notes that, in an era when professional athletes lacked free agency, the White Sox's formidable players had little choice but to accept Comiskey's substandard wages. She writes: "Swede Risberg and Lefty Williams made less than  $3,000 a year ($ today). Joe Jackson and Buck Weaver made only $6,000 a year ($ today). Eddie Cicotte had been promised a $10,000 ($ today) bonus if he could win 30 games in a season. When Cicotte closed in on the 30-game goal, Comiskey had him benched to keep him from reaching the mark." Comiskey's stated reason for having manager Kid Gleason bench Cicotte was that with the Sox headed for the World Series he had to protect his star pitcher's arm (Cicotte ended up with a 29-7 record for the 1919 season). In one incident, he promised his players a bonus for winning the 1919 pennant — the "bonus" turned out to be a case of flat champagne.

When the scandal broke late in the 1920 season, Comiskey suspended the suspected players, while admitting in the telegram he sent to them that he knew this action cost the White Sox a second straight pennant.  However, he initially defended the accused players and, in an unusual display of largesse, provided them with expensive legal representation.  He ultimately supported baseball commissioner Kenesaw Mountain Landis' decision to ban the implicated White Sox players from further participation in professional baseball, knowing full well that Landis' action would permanently sideline the core of his team. Indeed, the White Sox promptly tumbled into seventh place and would not be a factor in a pennant race again until , five years after Comiskey's death, and did not win another pennant until .

Legacy

Comiskey is sometimes credited with the innovation of playing the first base position behind first base or inside the foul line, a practice which has since become common. Later he had played a large role in the dissolution of the National Commission, baseball's former body of authority, following a quarrel with Ban Johnson. He was inducted into the National Baseball Hall of Fame in 1939. He was also named to the St. Louis Cardinals Hall of Fame in May 2022, as the selection of Cardinals managing partner William DeWitt Jr. for his accomplishments as manager of the St. Louis Browns.  

Comiskey died in Eagle River, Wisconsin in 1931, and was buried at Calvary Cemetery in Evanston. Comiskey's son J. Louis inherited the team but died a few years later. The trustees of his estate were going to sell the team, but J. Louis' widow Grace was able to gain control of the team and avoid a sale. Her two children, Dorothy Comiskey Rigney and Charles Albert Comiskey II (who served in the White Sox front office in the 1940s and 1950s before he became owner), became co-owners of the team following Grace's death in the 1950s.  Dorothy sold controlling interest in the team to Bill Veeck in 1958, but Chuck remained a minority owner until 1962.

When the White Sox moved to a new ballpark in 1991, the Comiskey Park name was carried over from their previous home (since 1910); it is now known as Guaranteed Rate Field. A statue of Comiskey stands near center field in the new ballpark.

Career statistics

As a manager

See also
 List of Major League Baseball career stolen bases leaders
 List of professional sports team owners
 List of Major League Baseball player-managers
 List of St. Louis Cardinals team records

References

Further reading
Riehle, Dave, "Say it Ain't So, Charlie:The 1897 Dispute Between Charles Comiskey and the St. Paul Labor Trades", Ramsey County History Quarterly V39 #2, Ramsey County Historical Society, St Paul, Minnesota, 2004.
 .

External links

1859 births
1931 deaths
19th-century baseball players
Major League Baseball player-managers
Chicago Pirates players
Chicago White Sox executives
Chicago White Sox owners
Cincinnati Reds managers
Cincinnati Reds players
Major League Baseball first basemen
Major League Baseball owners
Minor league baseball managers
National Baseball Hall of Fame inductees
St. Louis Browns (AA) managers
St. Louis Browns (AA) players
St. Louis Brown Stockings (AA) players
Troy Haymakers players
Dubuque Red Stockings players
St. Paul Apostles players
St. Paul Saints (Western League) players
Baseball players from Chicago
Comiskey family
People from Eagle River, Wisconsin
St. Ignatius College Prep alumni
Burials at Calvary Cemetery (Evanston, Illinois)